Hằng Phương (Điện Bàn, 9 September 1908 – 2 February 1983) was a Vietnamese poet. Her poetry has been characterised as intimist.

She was born into an educated Confucian family, and married writer Vũ Ngọc Phan. Her daughter is the painter Vũ Giáng Hương.

Works
 Hương xuân (1943, in collaboration with Anh Thơ, Vân Đài, Mộng Tuyết)
 Một mùa hoa (1960)
 Chim én bay xa (1962)
 Mùa gặt "Harvest" (1961)
 Hương đất nước (1974)

References

1908 births
1983 deaths
Vietnamese women poets
Vietnamese writers
People from Quảng Nam province